Ralph James Salisbury (January 24, 1926 - October 9, 2017) was an American poet. His poem "In the Children's Museum in Nashville" was published in The New Yorker in 1960, making him one of the first self-identified Native American poets to receive national attention.  His autobiography So Far So Good won the 2012 River Teeth Literary Nonfiction Prize. His book Light from a Bullet Hole: Poems New and Selected was nominated for the Pulitzer Prize in 2009.

Early life
Ralph Salisbury was born in 1926 on a farm in Fayette County in northeast Iowa to an Irish American mother and a father he claimed had English, Cherokee, and Shawnee ancestry, who raised him on a farm with no electricity or running water.  He survived a lightning strike at the age of 15. A year after graduating from Aurora (Iowa) High School at age 16, he enlisted in the Air Force and was trained as an aerial gunman, completing his training within days of the end of World War Two. The G.I Bill enabled him to enroll in the North Iowa Teachers College and, later, the University of Iowa, where he studied with Robert Lowell and earned a MFA degree. Despite identifying as Native American, Salisbury used the term "Caucasian" to refer to his appearance and was not enrolled with any Native American nation.

Awards
 C.E.S. Wood Retrospective Award (2015)
 River Teeth Literary Nonfiction Book Book Prize (2012)
 Rockefeller Bellagio Award in fiction (1992)
 Northwest Review Poetry Award
 Chapelbrook Award

Bibliography

Autobiography

 So Far So Good, University of Nebraska Press, 2013 (River Teeth Literary Nonfiction Prize).

Published poetry collections 

 Like the Sun in Storm, Habit of Rainy Nights Press, 2012 (nominated for the Oregon Book Award).
 Light from a Bullet Hole: Poems New and Selected, 1950-2008, Silverfish Review Press, 2009 (nominated for the Pulitzer Prize).
 Blind Pumper at the Well, Salt Publishing, Cambridge (UK), 2008.
 War in the Genes, Cherry Grove Editions, 2005.
 Rainbows of Stone, University of Arizona Press, September 2000.
 A White Rainbow, Poems of a Cherokee Heritage, Blue Cloud Press, 1985.
 Going to the Water: Poems of a Cherokee Heritage, Pacific House Books, 1983.
 Spirit Beast Chant, Blue Cloud Press, 1982.
 Pointing at the Rainbow, Blue Cloud Press, 1982.
 Ghost Grapefruit and Other Poems, Ithaca House, 1972.

Prose

 The Indian Who Bombed Berlin, stories, Michigan State University Press, 2009.
 The Last Rattlesnake Throw, stories, University of Oklahoma Press, 1998.
 One Indian and Two Chiefs, stories, Navajo Community College Press, 1993.

Translations

Poesie Da Un Retaggio Cherokee, Multimedia Edizioni, Salerno, Italy 1995, Tr. Prof. Fedora Giordano.

Death

Salisbury died peacefully on October 9, 2017. He was survived by his wife, Ingrid Wendt, and three children: Jeffrey Salisbury, Brian Salisbury, and Martina Salisbury.

References

External links 
 Ralph Salisbury's website
 Ralph Salisbury | Poetry Foundation
 So far, he's a writer - The Register-Guard
 Lyric Passion: Poet and teacher Ralph Salisbury's new collection, review of War in the Genes - Eugene Weekly

2017 deaths
20th-century American poets
21st-century American poets
American male poets
20th-century American male writers
1926 births
21st-century American male writers